Chioma Grace Ubogagu (born 10 September 1992) is an English professional footballer who plays mainly as a forward for Women's Super League club Tottenham Hotspur and the England national team. She previously played for Orlando Pride, Brisbane Roar, Houston Dash, Arsenal, and Real Madrid. Ubogagu played collegiate soccer for Stanford University and was capped at various youth levels for the United States, winning the 2012 FIFA U-20 Women's World Cup. She chose to represent the England national team at the senior level in 2018.

Early life and career
Ubogagu was born in London, where her parents, mother Tina a nurse and father Aloy a social worker, had moved from Nigeria seeking job opportunities. At age 3, her parents divorced and she moved with her mother and older brother to Coppell, Texas a suburb in the Dallas–Fort Worth metroplex.

Ubogagu led her club team, D'Feeters, to two Texas-North State Cup titles, a U.S. Youth Soccer Association Region II championship and a 2010 third-place U-17 national finish, and led Coppell High School to the 2009 Texas 5A state title. She was also named 2010 Gatorade Texas Player of the Year, all-America three times by ESPN RISE and twice each by the NSCAA and Parade. In addition, she was all All-Area selection by  Dallas Morning News, all four years of her high school career.

Ubogagu came to Stanford as the #1-ranked recruit in the nation by Top Drawer Soccer. During her freshman year, she won the Pac-12 Freshman of the Year in 2011 and helped the Cardinal win their first Women's College Cup, making the all-tournament team in the process. Stanford returned to the final in 2012 and to the semifinal in 2014. She finished her college career with 27 goals in 89 total appearances, made the All-Pac-12 team all four seasons, earning first-team honors in 2012 and 2014.

Club career

Arsenal
In January 2015, National Women's Soccer League's Sky Blue FC selected Ubogagu with the 28th pick of the 2015 NWSL College Draft, although coach Jim Gabarra acknowledged she was in negotiations with an FA WSL club. In February 2015, Ubogagu signed with Arsenal, the club she'd supported as a child and her British birth made it easier for her to acquire a United Kingdom work permit.

Ubogagu made her professional debut on 3 April 2015, scoring a goal in a 1–1 draw against Notts County.

Houston Dash
Arsenal released Ubogagu having reached the end of her contract in November 2015. She finished her season with seven goals in 21 appearances. Subsequently, the Houston Dash acquired the rights to Ubogagu from the Sky Blue FC in exchange for picks in the 2016 and 2017 college drafts. The trade gave the Dash an opportunity to sign her before the start of the NWSL season in March 2016.

Ubogagu was named NWSL Player of the Week in week 4 of the 2016 season for her one-goal and one assist performance to lead Houston to a 2–1 victory over FC Kansas City.

Orlando Pride
On 23 January 2017, the Orlando Pride acquired Ubogagu from the Houston Dash, in exchange for Orlando's natural third round pick in the 2018 NWSL College Draft. In 2017 Ubogagu appeared in 19 games for Orlando, scoring 4 goals. On 16 February 2018 the Orlando Pride announced they had signed Ubogagu to a new contract ahead of the 2018 season. On 29 August 2019, Ubogagu was waived by the Orlando Pride to allow her to pursue a playing opportunity in Europe.

Brisbane Roar (loan)
On 5 October 2018, Brisbane Roar announced they had signed Ubogagu for the 2018–19 W-League season, where she would be joining fellow Orlando Pride teammate Carson Pickett on loan. She scored her first goal for the team on 29 November 2018, in a 1–0 victory over Newcastle Jets. She ended the season with 2 goals.

CD Tacón/Real Madrid
On 31 August 2019, Ubogagu joined Spanish Primera División team CD Tacón.

Tottenham Hotspur
On 31 July 2021, Ubogagu joined Tottenham Hotspur on a two-year contract. In April 2022, Ubogagu was suspended for 9 months backdated to start from January 2022 for anti-doping violations as a result of taking medication prescribed by a personal doctor to treat acne before signing for the club.

International career
Because of her parents and her place of birth, Ubogagu was eligible to represent Nigeria, England or the United States. She chose to represent the United States at the youth level, playing for their under-18, under-20 and under-23 teams. She settled on representing England at the senior level, accepting a call up from the side in October 2018 and making her England and senior international debut on 8 November 2018.

Ubogagu has represented the United States at youth levels, including U-18, U-20, and U-23 teams. With the U-20, she won the 2012 FIFA U-20 Women's World Cup, appearing in all six games and scoring once, and the 2012 CONCACAF Women's U-20 Championship, where she scored the winning goal in the final, and scored six goals in a stretch of eight games at one point in 2012.

Ubogagu received her first call-up to the United States Women's National Team on 31 October 2017 for the set of two friendlies against Canada in November. Ubogagu was not capped for the full national team and she did not dress as part of the 18 for either game.

Phil Neville called Ubogagu up to the England national team for a set of friendlies in November 2018 against Sweden and Austria. She scored on her England and senior international debut in a 3–0 win against Austria on 8 November 2018.

Personal life
Her grandfather Austin Eneuke played for Nigeria and Tottenham Hotspur. Ubogagu became an Arsenal fan watching the North London derby, despite her father urging her to support Tottenham.

Her name Chioma means "Good God" in the Igbo language, spoken primarily by the Igbo people in south eastern Nigeria.

Career statistics

Club
.

International 

Scores and results list England goal tally first, score column indicates score after each Ubogagu goal.

Honours
United States U20

 FIFA U-20 Women's World Cup: 2012
 CONCACAF Women's U-20 Championship: 2012

England
 SheBelieves Cup: 2019

References

External links

 
 Stanford  profile
 US Soccer profile
 Arsenal profile
 

1992 births
Living people
Footballers from Greater London
American women's soccer players
English emigrants to the United States
Stanford Cardinal women's soccer players
Arsenal W.F.C. players
American people of Igbo descent
American expatriates in England
Women's Super League players
Pali Blues players
Soccer players from Texas
Sportspeople from the Dallas–Fort Worth metroplex
People from Coppell, Texas
Parade High School All-Americans (girls' soccer)
Women's association football forwards
Houston Dash players
Brisbane Roar FC (A-League Women) players
National Women's Soccer League players
Igbo sportspeople
NJ/NY Gotham FC draft picks
United States women's under-20 international soccer players
English people of Nigerian descent
American sportspeople of Nigerian descent
Orlando Pride players
English women's footballers
England women's international footballers
English expatriate sportspeople in the United States
Expatriate women's soccer players in the United States
English expatriate women's footballers
Real Madrid Femenino players
Primera División (women) players
African-American women's soccer players
21st-century African-American sportspeople
21st-century African-American women
Black British sportswomen